Rildo da Costa Menezes (23 January 1942 – 16 May 2021), also known as Rildo, was a Brazilian professional footballer who played as a defender.

Club career
Rildo was the last of Santos Golden Era players, which included Pelé, Pepe, Coutinho, Clodoaldo and many others. His career began in 1959 when he signed a youth contract with Botafogo. In 1961 he began his senior career with Botafogo, two times winner in 1961 and 1962, and Brazilian Championship in 1963. In 1967, he transferred to Santos FC. Three time winner of Săo Paulo State Championship he captained the team that won (1967, 1968, 1969).  From 1963 to 1970, he played for the Brazil national team. In 1977, he joined Pelé with the New York Cosmos of the North American Soccer League. In 1978, he played for the Southern California Lazers of the American Soccer League and was selected to the ASL all-star team that season. In 1979, he played for the California Sunshine. On 16 April 1980, he signed with the Cleveland Cobras of the American Soccer League.

International career
Rildo earned 49 caps, scoring one goal, with the Brazil national team from 1963 to 1969. He was a member of the Brazilian team at the 1966 FIFA World Cup where he scored his lone national team goal in a 3–1 loss to Portugal.

Coaching career
In 1990, Rildo coached the California Emperors. In 1993, he coached the Los Angeles Salsa of the American Professional Soccer League. In October 1993, he resigned after the team lost the championship game. In 1995, he coached the San Fernando Valley Golden Eagles of the USISL.

Rildo was an assistant coach with the Marlborough High School soccer team where he oversaw the junior varsity. He assisted professional British Head Coach Gareth Pashley to their most successful season in the High School's history.

Death
Rildo died in Los Angeles on 16 May 2021, aged 79.

Honours
Botafogo FR
 Campeonato Carioca: 1961, 1962
 Torneio Rio-São Paulo: 1962, 1966

Santos FC
 Campeonato Paulista: 1967, 1968 e 1969
 Recopa Sudamericana: 1968
 Intercontinental Champions' Supercup: 1968. 
 Torneio Roberto Gomes Pedrosa: 1968

New York Cosmos
 NASL: 1977

References

External links
 NASL/MISL stats
 FIFA player profile

1942 births
2021 deaths
Sportspeople from Recife
Brazilian footballers
Association football defenders
Brazil international footballers
1966 FIFA World Cup players
American Soccer League (1933–1983) players
Major Indoor Soccer League (1978–1992) players
North American Soccer League (1968–1984) players
Botafogo de Futebol e Regatas players
California Sunshine players
Cleveland Cobras players
Cleveland Force (original MISL) players
New York Cosmos players
Santos FC players
Southern California Lazers players
Sport Club do Recife players
Brazilian football managers
American Professional Soccer League coaches
USISL coaches
Brazilian expatriate footballers
Brazilian expatriate sportspeople in the United States
Expatriate soccer managers in the United States
Expatriate soccer players in the United States